The Northern Ontario Scotties Tournament of Hearts is the provincial women's championships of curling in Northern Ontario, Canada. Beginning with the 2015 Scotties Tournament of Hearts, the winning team will have a direct entry to the Scotties Tournament of Hearts, Canada's national women's curling championship.

In 2008, following the formation of the Northern Ontario Curling Association (NOCA), Northern Ontario held its first provincial women's curling championship, with the top four teams playing in the Ontario Scotties Tournament of Hearts. Prior to 2007, Northeastern Ontario and Northwestern Ontario each had their own qualifying tournaments for the Ontario championship. Northern Ontario was awarded a direct entry to the national championship beginning in 2015.

The tournament has only been won by two skips, Tracy Fleury and Krista McCarville.

Winners

Number of titles
As of the 2023 Northern Ontario Scotties Tournament of Hearts

Notes

References

External links
List of champions

See also

Scotties Tournament of Hearts provincial tournaments
Curling in Northern Ontario
2007 establishments in Ontario
Recurring sporting events established in 2007